743 Eugenisis is a minor planet orbiting the Sun that was discovered by German astronomer Franz Kaiser in 1913.

Photometric observations of this asteroid collected during 2004 show a rotation period of 10.23 ± 0.01 hours with a brightness variation of 0.20 ± 0.02 magnitude. The spectrum of this object matches the Ch class in the SMASS taxonomy, indicating a carbonaceous surface with a hydrous component.

References

External links
 
 

Background asteroids
Eugenisis
Eugenisis
Ch-type asteroids (SMASS)
19130225